The Test is a 1914 silent film short directed by and starring Wallace Reid and costarring Dorothy Davenport and Frank Lloyd, later a famous director. Allan Dwan wrote the scenario. It was produced at the Nestor Film Company and released through Universal Film Manufacturing Company.

Cast
Wallace Reid - The Poor Man
Dorothy Davenport - The Poor Man's Wife
Frank Lloyd - The Rich Man
Ed Brady - 
Antrim Short - 
Gertrude Short - 
Gladys Montague -

See also
Wallace Reid filmography

References

External links
 The Test at IMDb.com

1914 short films
American silent short films
Lost American films
Films directed by Wallace Reid
Universal Pictures short films
American black-and-white films
Silent American drama films
1914 drama films
1914 films
1914 lost films
Lost drama films
1910s American films